Lockheed  L-301 (sometimes called the X-24C, though this designation was never officially assigned) was an experimental air-breathing hypersonic aircraft project. It was developed by the NASA and United States Air Force (USAF) organization National Hypersonic Flight Research Facility (NHFRF or NHRF), with Skunk Works as the prime contractor.  In January 1977, the program was "tentatively scheduled to operate two vehicles for eight years and to conduct 100 flights per vehicle."  NASA discontinued work on L-301 and NHRF in September 1977 due to budget constraints and lack of need.

Development
The L-301 HGV was intended to be a follow-on to the X-15 and X-24 (specifically the X-24B) programs, to take lessons learned from both and integrate them into an airframe capable of at least reaching Mach 8 and engaging in hypersonic skip-glide maneuvers for long range missions. While the NASA program, one of several to use the tentative X-24C designator, was ostensibly canceled in 1977, it was only canceled at the time because of USAF disclosures of duplicate black programs with the same contractors for similar vehicles. The vehicle used both air breathing ram or scramjet propulsion as well as a rocket engine, carrying both RP-1 and LH2 propellant as well as on-board stores of LOX.

Drawings and mission profiles are available from the NASA website.

Design

Propulsion
Originally intended to carry the same XLR-99 engine used by the X-15, the primary engine was changed to the LR-105, which was the sustainer engine used on the Atlas launcher. As such, this vehicle was plainly not intended to reach orbit.

Airframe
Design of the aircraft in various wind tunnel models and contractor drawings seems to follow variations of the FDL-5 and FDL-8 lifting body shapes originally developed by the USAF Flight Dynamics Laboratory in the 1950s, which were used in the earlier X-23 and X-24A/B programs. With a radically swept delta wing, and 2, 3, or 4 vertical stabilizers, as well as several body flaps (depending on the model), the vehicle did not lack for control surfaces.

References

Further reading
Miller, Jay. The X-Planes: X-1 to X-45. Hinckley, UK: Midland, 2001.
Rose, Bill, 2008. Secret Projects: Military Space Technology. Hinckley, England: Midland Publishing.

External links
 Encyclopedia Astronautica
 Publicly archived Air Force picture
 Nasa Archives- X-24C Phase 3

Cancelled military aircraft projects of the United States
Lifting bodies
L-0301
Crewed spacecraft
Hypersonic aircraft
Parasite aircraft
Rocket-powered aircraft
Scramjet-powered aircraft
Spaceplanes
Cancelled spacecraft